Bagdat Batyrbekuly Musin (Bağdat Batyrbekūly Musin; born 3 March 1983) is a Kazakh politician that is serving as the Minister of Digital Development, Innovation and Aerospace Industry since 2 September 2020.

Biography

Early life and education 
Musin was born in the town of Ekibastuz. In 2004, he graduated from the Suleyman Demirel University in Kaskelen with a degree in computer science and software. From there, Musin attended the he entered the Kazakh Ablai Khan University of International Relations and World Languages, from which he graduated two years later with a degree in law.

Early career 
From 2004 to 2007, Musin was the chief software engineer, then deputy director of the IT Department at National Information Technologies JSC. From 2007 to 2011, he held various positions in the Ministry of Justice such as being the head of the Information Technology Department of the ministry.

In 2011, he became the deputy chairman of the Committee for Automation of Public Services and Coordination in the Ministry of Communications and Information, later becoming the chairman in 2012. 

From April to August 2014, Musin served as the chairman of the Board of JSC National Information Technologies. He then became the chairman of the Board of Kazpost. During this period, under Musin's leadership, the process of modernization of the enterprise began. One of the most important innovations was the introduction of system automation of the process of issuing pensions and benefits. Also during this period, the company launched a global tracking system for postal items, opened a network of parcel terminals and the first parcel supermarket in Kazakhstan.

From 2017 to 2018, Musin was the chairman of the Committee on Legal Statistics and Special Accounting of the Prosecutor General's Office of Kazakhstan. 

In March 2020, he was appointed as an adviser to the President of Kazakhstan on Digitalization and Innovative Technologies.

On January 12, 2023, he headed the Sports Programming Federation.

Political career 
From 20 July 2020, Musin temporarily served as a First Vice and Acting Minister of Digital Development, Innovation and Aerospace Industry after his predecessor Askar Zhumagaliyev was relieved from his post. Musin was fully appointed to the position on 2 September 2020.

Personal life 
Musin is married and has two daughters and a son. He was awarded with such medals as "Eren enbegi ushin" and "20 years of independence of the Republic of Kazakhstan". Musin also speaks Kazakh, Russian, English and Turkish.

References 

1983 births
Government ministers of Kazakhstan
Kazakh Ablai Khan University alumni
Living people